Kik Pierie (born 20 July 2000) is a Dutch professional footballer who plays as a centre-back for Eredivisie club Excelsior on loan from Ajax.

Club career

SC Heerenveen 
Pierie started his professional career with SC Heerenveen, where he played three seasons with the club.  He scored his first goal in a 3-5 loss vs. Feyenoord on 26 August 2018.

Ajax 
In April 2019, it was announced Pierie would join Ajax in the summer of 2019 having agreed a five-year contract. The transfer fee paid to SC Heerenveen was reported as at least €4 million.

Loan to FC Twente 
On 16 July 2020, Pierie joined FC Twente on a season-long loan deal, having mostly appeared for the Ajax reserve team, Jong Ajax, during the previous season.

On 21 May 2021, it was announced that Pierie's loan would be extended for another season.

Loan to Excelsior 
On 30 November 2022, Pierie agreed to join Excelsior on loan for the second part of the 2022–23 season.

International career 
Since he was born in Boston, Pierie is eligible to represent the United States national team, but he has represented the Netherlands at various youth levels.

Personal life
His father is former Dutch field hockey player , currently professor of Endoscopic Surgery at University Medical Center Groningen. When Kik was born, Jean-Pierre worked at the Harvard Medical School. His younger brothers Take (by SC Heerenveen) and Stijn Pierie (LAC Frisia), are footballers too.

References

External links
 
 

2000 births
People from Boston
Soccer players from Massachusetts
American people of Dutch descent
Living people
Association football defenders
Dutch footballers
Netherlands youth international footballers
SC Heerenveen players
AFC Ajax players
Jong Ajax players
FC Twente players
Excelsior Rotterdam players
Eredivisie players
Eerste Divisie players